38083 Rhadamanthus  is a trans-Neptunian object (TNO). It was discovered in 1999 by the Deep Ecliptic Survey. It was originally mistakenly thought to be a plutino.

Discovery and naming 

Rhadamanthus was discovered on 17 April 1999 by the Deep Ecliptic Survey.

Rhadamanthus is named after the Greek mythological figure. The name was announced in the circular of the Minor Planet Center of 24 July 2002, which stated "Rhadamanthus was a son of Zeus and Europa. Because of his just and upright life, after death he was appointed a judge of the dead and the ruler of Elysium, a blissfully beautiful area of the Underworld where those favored by the gods spent their life after death. The name was suggested by E. K. Elliot."

Planetary symbols are no longer much used in astronomy, so Rhadamanthus never received a symbol in the astronomical literature. There is no standard symbol for Rhadamanthus used by astrologers either. A Unicode proposal for dwarf-planet symbols notes a symbol  that has been used, but leaves it unexplained.

References

External links 
 

Kuiper belt objects
Discoveries by the Deep Ecliptic Survey
Rhadamanthus
19990417